Les Collines noires is a Lucky Luke adventure written by Goscinny and illustrated by Morris. It is the 21st book in the series and it was originally published in French in 1963 and in English by Cinebook in 2009 as The Black Hills. In it Lucky Luke accompanies a group of (European) scientists that have been commissioned to see whether the land behind the Black Hills should be opened to pioneers. Muscle meets brain power (even for those who did not have an uncle in Vienna).

Synopsis 
Lucky Luke is responsible for taking four scientists across the Black Hills to study colonization opportunities. Senator Stormwind, opposed to the project, sends Bull Bullets to fight the expedition. Lucky Luke and the scientists first take the train to Des Moines, Iowa. Bull Bullets is following them closely since he is taking the same train. He takes advantage of the absence of Luke to play poker with the four scientists and accuse them of being cheaters because they all have four aces (except Doublelap who has only three). They are kicked off the train but Lucky Luke forces the train back and resumes the journey with them. The Bull Bullets card game is reviewed and it turns out that it contains 48 aces out of 52 cards. The train resumes its trip to Des Moines. At the Chicago stop, Bull Bullets flies with the train while all the passengers have left to rest in the station. Fortunately, there is an emergency locomotive with only one car. All passengers are housed in this one and so Lucky Luke and the scientists reach Des Moines. Bull Bullets, who arrived before them, has chartered the stagecoach for Omaha (Nebraska) where they must go and he has rented all available horses. Lucky Luke asks an undertaker from the place to drive them to Omaha in his vehicle. The undertaker agrees, especially since he thinks he can find more work in Omaha, a rather anarchic city. Bull Bullets pays a killer named Nebraska Kid to get rid of the expedition.

When Luke and the scientists enter the saloon, Nebraska Kid jostles one of the scientists and provokes him into a duel. Frankenbaum, who says he is offended, says he has the choice of weapons and chooses the foil. The killer, who did not expect that, is beaten and, humiliated, must withdraw. The next day, Lucky Luke and the scientists rent horses and mules and depart to the Black Hills they reach a few days later. Bull Bullets, however, beats them there. He tries to get them down but they escape unhindered from his wiles and eventually arrive in Wyoming in the heart of Cheyenne territory. Bull Bullets goes to Cheyenne homeland to assemble them against Lucky Luke and the others, declaring that they want to seize their territory and that they will prevent them from drinking fire-water. The discontented Cheyenne take advantage of Lucky Luke's absence to capture the scientists. Luke tracks them to their camp and sees the scientists tied to poles. He also sees Bull Bullets inebriating the Indians. At night, Luke takes advantage of the Indians' sleep to free the scientists and to imprison the son of the chief. The latter, with his men, immediately sets out to find them and manages to make them prisoners. However, the son persuades his father not to hurt them because they showed him the dangers of fire-water. Bull Bullets tries to make them believe that these statements are only a sham but it is neutralized by Lucky Luke. Defeated, Bull Bullets admits he is the employee of Senator Stormwind who wanted to prevent the expedition because he feared that his sale of arms and alcohol to the Cheyennes would be compromised. Then it's back to Washington, the scientists being persuaded that Wyoming can open to colonization. A peace treaty is signed with the Cheyenne. Stormwind and Bull Bullets are sent to the same penitentiary as Billy the Kid and the Dalton brothers. These promise to make room by escaping.

Characters 

 The scientists
 Darryl Bundlofjoy: Surveyor, always moves with a target.
 Ira Doublelap: Geologist.
 Gustav Frankenbaum: Anthropologist, a native of Vienna, wins a duel with foil against Nebraska Kid.
 Simeon Gurgle: Biologist, always with a magnifying glass.
 The Cheyenne
 Yellow dog: Alcoholic, father of Petit Roquet, who will finally convince him of the evils of alcohol.
 Petit Roquet: Son of the chief of the Cheyenne tribe who captures the scientists, he accuses Bull Bullets of alcohol and weapons trafficking; convinced by the scientists of the evils of alcohol, he will support the colonization of Wyoming and eventually become a professor at the University of Vienna.
 The villains
Bull Bullets: Senator Stormwind instructed him to sabotage the Black Hills expedition.
 Nebraska Kid: Recruited by Bull Bullets as "the best shooter in the region", with a tattoo "To my mom" on the chest, fights against Frankenbaum, but as he has no choice of weapons, the duel is with foils.
 Senator Orwell Stormwind: wants to defeat the colonization of Wyoming because he is at the head of a trafficking of arms and alcohol to the Indians.

External links
Lucky Luke official site album index 
Goscinny website on Lucky Luke

Comics by Morris (cartoonist)
Lucky Luke albums
1963 graphic novels
Works by René Goscinny